The Shanghai University of Technology (SUT) was a municipal public university in Shanghai, China.

The Shanghai University of Technology, the Shanghai University of Science and Technology, Shanghai University, and the Shanghai Institute of Science and Technology merged to establish the current Shanghai University in May 1994.

History

Shanghai University was rebuilt in 1994, by consolidating Shanghai University of Technology, Shanghai University of Science & Technology, Shanghai Institute of Science & Technology and the former Shanghai University.

Shanghai University of Technology was once Shanghai Institute of Technology founded in 1960, with strong background from engineering, technology and industries. The institute was renamed as Shanghai University of Technology in 1979. Professor Qian Weichang was the president of the university since 1982 and eventually led to the consolidated Shanghai University in 1994.

Location
Shanghai University of Technology site now is Shanghai University, Yanchang Campus.

149 Yanchang RD, Shanghai 200072, China

上海市延长路149号

President
WeiChang Chien 钱伟长 (1982–1994)

References

Defunct universities and colleges in Shanghai
Educational institutions established in 1960
1960 establishments in China
1994 disestablishments in China
Technical universities and colleges in China